Lakewood School District may refer to:

Lakewood School District (New Jersey), Lakewood, New Jersey
Lakewood School District (Washington), North Lakewood, Washington